This is a list of members of the Tasmanian Legislative Council between 1987 and 1993. Terms of the Legislative Council did not coincide with Legislative Assembly elections, and members served six year terms, with a number of members facing election each year.

Elections

Members

Notes
  In January 1992, Hank Petrusma resigned to contest a House of Assembly seat in the 1992 elections, but was unsuccessful. Jean Moore won the resulting by-election on 11 April 1992.

Sources
 Parliament of Tasmania (2006). The Parliament of Tasmania from 1856

Members of Tasmanian parliaments by term
20th-century Australian politicians